Heath Clark (born October 14, 1980) is an American Software Engineer, Software Systems Engineer and politician from Georgia. Clark is a Republican member of Georgia House of Representatives from the 147th district since 2015.

Early life 
Clark's father was in the U.S. Air Force.
At 2 weeks old, Clark's family lived in Japan. In 1983, Clark's family moved to Georgia. Clark grew up in Warner Robins, Georgia. In 1999, Clark graduated from Warner Robins High School.

Education 
Clark attended Southeastern Baptist Theological Seminary in Wake Forrest, North Carolina. Clarked earned an Associates degree from Georgia Military College. In 2005, Clark earned a Bachelor of Arts degree in Information Technology from Middle Georgia State University in Macon, Georgia.

Career 
Clark started his career as a pastor.
Clark is a Software Engineer and a Software Systems Engineer.

On November 4, 2014, Clark won the election unopposed and became a Republican member of Georgia House of Representatives for District 147. On November 8, 2016, as an incumbent, Clark won the election unopposed and continued serving District 147. On November 6, 2018, as an incumbent, Clark won the election and continued serving District 147. Clark defeated Fenika Miller with 54.15% of the votes. On November 3, 2020, as an incumbent, Clark won the election and continued serving District 147. Clark defeated Stephen Baughier with 52.26% of the votes.

Personal life 
Clark's wife is Lindsey Clark. They have four children. Clark and his family live in Warner Robins, Georgia.

See also 
 2020 Georgia House of Representatives election

References

External links 
 Heath N. Clark at ballotpedia.org
 Heath N Clark at ourcampaigns.com

1980 births
American software engineers
Engineers from Georgia (U.S. state)
Living people
People from Warner Robins, Georgia
21st-century American politicians
Republican Party members of the Georgia House of Representatives